The 2020 Contender Boats 250 was a NASCAR Xfinity Series race held on June 14, 2020 at Homestead–Miami Speedway in Homestead, Florida. Contested over 177 laps—extended from 167 laps due to a double overtime finish—on the  oval, it was the tenth race of the 2020 NASCAR Xfinity Series season and the season's second Dash 4 Cash race. Stewart-Haas Racing driver Chase Briscoe won his third race of the season.

The Contender Boats 250 replaced Iowa Speedway's first date for the 2020 Xfinity Series season due to the COVID-19 pandemic. It was the second race in two days for the Xfinity Series, following Friday's Hooters 250.

Report

Background 

Homestead-Miami Speedway is a motor racing track located in Homestead, Florida. The track, which has several configurations, has promoted several series of racing, including NASCAR, the NTT IndyCar Series and the Grand-Am Rolex Sports Car Series

From 2002 to 2019, Homestead-Miami Speedway  hosted the final race of the season in all three of NASCAR's series: the NASCAR Cup Series, Xfinity Series and Gander RV & Outdoors Truck Series.

The race was held without fans in attendance due to the ongoing COVID-19 pandemic.

Dash 4 Cash 
The Dash 4 Cash is a series of four races in the NASCAR Xfinity Series, preceded by a qualifying race. The top four points-eligible drivers in the previous race are eligible to win a $100,000 bonus on top of their race winnings if they win the race. Cup Series regulars are not permitted to compete in the races.

The Contender Boats 250 was the season's second Dash 4 Cash race. A. J. Allmendinger, Noah Gragson, Justin Haley, and Daniel Hemric were eligible to win after finishing in the top 4 at the EchoPark 250 at Atlanta.

Entry list 

 (R) denotes rookie driver.
 (i) denotes driver who is ineligible for series driver points.

Qualifying 
Myatt Snider was awarded the pole for the race as determined by the top 15 from Saturday's finishing order inverted.

Starting Lineup 

 . – Eligible for Dash 4 Cash prize money.
 The No. 8, No. 07, and No. 02 had to start from the rear due to a driver change from Saturday's race.
 The No. 7, No. 02, and No. 52 had to start from the rear due to using a backup car.
 The No. 9 had to start from the rear due to unapproved adjustments.

Race

Race results

Stage Results 
Stage One

Laps: 40

Stage Two

Laps: 40

Final Stage Results 
Laps: 87

 . – Won the Dash 4 Cash prize money and subsequently qualified for the Dash 4 Cash prize money in the next race.
 . – Qualified for Dash 4 Cash prize money in the next race.

Race statistics 

 Lead changes: 20 among 8 different drivers
 Cautions/Laps: 6 for 28
 Red flags: 0
 Time of race: 2 hours, 15 minutes, 52 seconds
 Average speed:

Media

Television 
The Contender Boats 250 was carried by FS1 in the United States. Adam Alexander, Jamie McMurray, and Michael Waltrip called the race from the Fox Sports Studio in Charlotte, with Regan Smith covering pit road.

Radio 
The Motor Racing Network (MRN) called the race for radio, which was simulcast on SiriusXM NASCAR Radio. Dave Moody and Jeff Striegle anchored the action from the booth. Mike Bagley called the race from turns 1 & 2 and Alex Hayden called the action through turns 3 & 4. NASCAR Hall of Fame Executive Director Winston Kelley and Steve Post provided reports from pit road.

Standings after the race 

 Drivers' Championship standings

 Note: Only the first 12 positions are included for the driver standings.
 . – Driver has clinched a position in the NASCAR playoffs.

References 

2020 NASCAR Xfinity Series
2020 in sports in Florida
Contender Boats 250
NASCAR races at Homestead-Miami Speedway